Ma Belle may refer to:

"Ma-Ma-Ma Belle", song by the Electric Light Orchestra
"Ma Belle Amie", 1970 single by Tee Set 
"Ma Belle Marguerite", song from the musical Bless the Bride
"Ma belle", a 2019 song by Moha La Squale

See also
 Ma Bell, nickname for the Bell System telephone companies